Shi Longfei (born 18 January 1994) is a Chinese badminton player from Shanghai. He was part of the Chinese junior team that won the mixed team silver medal at the 2012 Asian Junior Championships. Teamed-up with Chen Zhuofu in the men's doubles, they finished as the semi finalist and settled for the bronze medal at the 2014 Asian Championships, defeated by their teammates Li Junhui and Liu Yuchen with the score 9–21, 14–21. Shi was the mixed doubles champion at the 2017 Vietnam International tournament partnered with Tang Pingyang.

Achievements

Asian Championships 
Men's doubles

BWF International Challenge/Series 
Mixed doubles

  BWF International Challenge tournament
  BWF International Series tournament
  BWF Future Series tournament

References

External links 
 

1994 births
Living people
Badminton players from Shanghai
Chinese male badminton players